Touchstone Semiconductor Inc. was a manufacturer of analog integrated circuit (IC) components for industrial control, consumer electronics, medical, telecommunications, and other industries.

Touchstone Semiconductor was founded in 2010 by a group of semiconductor industry experts from Maxim Integrated Products, Linear Technology and Analog Devices. The company received $12M funding in Series A funding from Opus Capital and Khosla Ventures, the headquarters were located in Milpitas, California.

Touchstone's assets were acquired by Silicon Labs in March 2014.

References

Fabless semiconductor companies
Companies based in Milpitas, California
American companies established in 2010
Defunct semiconductor companies of the United States
2010 establishments in California